Lindera reticulosa is a species of plant in the family Lauraceae. It is a tree endemic to Peninsular Malaysia.

References

reticulosa
Endemic flora of Peninsular Malaysia
Trees of Peninsular Malaysia
Least concern plants
Taxonomy articles created by Polbot
Plants described in 1974
Taxa named by André Joseph Guillaume Henri Kostermans